Chichester South is an electoral division of West Sussex in the United Kingdom, and returns one member to sit on West Sussex County Council.

Extent
The division covers the southern part of the town of Chichester; and the villages of Apuldram, Donnington, Highleigh, Hunston and Sidlesham.

It comprises the following Chichester District wards: Chichester South Ward, Donnington Ward and Sidlesham Ward; and of the following civil parishes: Appledram, the southern part of Chichester, Donnington, Hunston, North Mundham and Sidlesham.

Election results

2013 Election
Results of the election held on 2 May 2013:

2009 Election
Results of the election held on 4 June 2009:

2005 Election
Results of the election held on 5 May 2005:

References
Election Results - West Sussex County Council

External links
 West Sussex County Council
 Election Maps

Electoral Divisions of West Sussex